Athrips mongolorum is a moth of the family Gelechiidae. It is found in Mongolia, Turkmenistan, south-eastern Kazakhstan and China (Ningxia).

The wingspan is 9–12 mm. The forewings are whitish yellow to cream, covered with white and grey scales. There are two or three dark spots at the base, three dark spots surrounded by tufts of ochreous scales at about the middle and two very small spots at two-thirds. The hindwings are light grey. Adults are on wing from mid-March to early June and again in September in two generations per year.

The larvae feed on Nitraria schoberi. They tie the leaves of their host plant with silk, feeding from inside the shelter or mining the terminal leaves. The larvae are light green. The species overwinters in the pupal stage.

References

Moths described in 1980
Athrips
Moths of Asia